Uydenia is an extinct genus of prehistoric bony fish.

See also

 Prehistoric fish
 List of prehistoric bony fish

References

External links
 Bony fish in the online Sepkoski Database

Palaeonisciformes